The Yamaha FZ150i (called V-Ixion/Vixion in Indonesia) is a lightweight 150 cc motorcycle manufactured by Yamaha Motor Company exclusively for Southeast Asian markets. It was launched in Indonesia in June 2007 at Palembang Indah Mall, Palembang and then Malaysia in January 2008 at First World Hotel, Genting Highlands as the first completely knocked down (CKD) bike to be fuel-injected in Asian motorcycle market.

Marketing 
In Malaysia, the FZ150i is locally assembled at the Hong Leong Yamaha (HLY) plant at Sungai Buloh, Selangor. According to HLY website, this model is expected to be sold by 500 units a month after the first year of its introduction. Apart from Indonesia and Malaysia, the FZ150i is also available in other Asian countries such as in Philippines, Singapore and Vietnam.

Model updates 

The updated version of the FZ150i was launched in Indonesia as V-Ixion Lightning in 2013 and in Malaysia in April 2014. An oxygen sensor was added to the exhaust port of the engine. The front and rear tires were upgraded with Dunlop D102A 90/80-17 at the front and 120/70-17 at the rear, mated with star-shaped 5-spoke alloy wheels. Rear braking is improved by using a Nissin single piston calliper with 200 mm disc. It has a grab bar for pillion is positioned under the side rear body of the bike.

In late 2015, the bike had some minor changes including the redesigned headlamp and instrument panels, shorter rear fender, and a Euro 3 compliant exhaust system. This model is known as V-Ixion Advance in Indonesia.

The 2017 update of the FZ150i/V-Ixion was revealed at the 2017 Indonesia International Motor Show, Jakarta in late April 2017. It has a completely different bodywork compared to the previous model. This version has 2 variants:
Standard V-Ixion which used the same engine, frame, transmission, wheels, and rear swingarm as the previous version. This version also adds assist and slipper clutch as a standard equipment.
V-Ixion R which shared the same engine, frame, transmission, wheels, and rear swingarm with the 2017 version of the YZF-R15. This variant has a wider rear tire and longer wheelbase compared to the standard version.

Specifications

References

External links 
 Yamaha Motor Co.,Ltd. 
  (India)

FZ150i
Standard motorcycles
Motorcycles introduced in 2007